Cedric Pittman (born June 8, 1977) is a former American football defensive end and arena football offensive / defensive lineman. He played college football at San Jose City College and Nevada.

Professional career
After going unselected in the 1998 NFL Draft, Pittman signed with the Detroit Lions. In April 2000, he joined the New York Giants. Where he spent 2000 and 2001. He also played for the Birmingham Thunderbolts of the short-lived XFL. He then played for the Scottish Claymores of NFL Europe in 2002, leading the Claymores in sacks with four. After the NFL Europe season ended, he was signed by the Tampa Bay Buccaneers. Then, in 2003, he joined the San Jose Sabercats of the Arena Football League (AFL). He then spent 2004 with the Las Vegas Gladiators.

References

1977 births
Living people
American football defensive ends
Detroit Lions players
New York Giants players
Scottish Claymores players
Birmingham Thunderbolts players
Tampa Bay Buccaneers players
Las Vegas Gladiators players
Nevada Wolf Pack football players